The Emperor's railway station or Emperor's Tsarskoye Selo Station, known as the Emperor's Pavilion (transliteration Imperatorsky pavilyon), is a former railway station terminal in Russia, in the town Tsarskoye Selo (now Pushkin, Saint Petersburg), which served the last monarch of Russia Emperor Nicholas II with his family and courtiers over his dedicated  that eventually consisted of three lines to link the capital city of the empire, Saint Petersburg, with two of the suburban royal residences in the towns of Tsarskoye Selo (Rus. "Royal Village") and Gatchina. The Tsarskoye Selo Alexander Palace and Park estate was home to Nicholas and his family for their last 13 years.

Map

The first station 
In 1895, at the beginning of the reign of Tsar Nicholas II, a pavilion was built to accommodate the Imperial family when traveling by train from St. Petersburg to the Alexandrovskaya station, which served Tsarskoye Selo. Approved on 30 June 1895, a wooden Imperial Pavilion with a covered platform was built. The pavilion was asymmetrical in plan and had only 4 rooms. The total area of the building was 24.38 square meters. A year later, on 9 August 1896, a project for an extension to the Imperial Pavilion was approved.

The total area of the pavilion increased to 41.7 square meters. The so-called  Imperial branch of the Moscow-Vindava-Rybinsk railway, starting at the Imperial Pavilion adjacent to the Vitebsky railway station opened in 1902. It started at Vitebsk station, where a special pavilion for the Emperor and his relatives was built in 1902. It ran parallel to the main line of the Tsarskoye Selo Railway and then branched south west at the village of Kouzmino. In 1903, the line was extended to the Imperial pavilion. It was reserved for members of the imperial family and representatives of foreign powers.

The second station 
The railway station was completed in 1912. 
A long alley of lime trees still leads to the Feodorovsky Imperial Cathedral and then a paved road leads to the Alexander Palace, located one kilometer from the station.
After the revolution the station was renamed " Uritsky Pavilion" in 1918 and closed a few years after the Second World War. The pavilion itself suffered from damage during the German occupation.

Architecture
The style of the pavilion is Russian Revival architecture, as with the Feodorovsky Village and its buildings (the cathedral, the personal guardhouse of the Emperor, the Palace of Arms, etc.) which are all nearby. The platforms were two hundred meters long and were covered for a hundred metres. The entrance had a porch with a pointed roof supported by four pillars and surmounted by a double-headed eagle decorated with kokoshniks. The interior of the pavilion is adorned with frescoes imitating 16th-century Moscovite frescoes, carried out by the artists of the Moscow workshop of the "Heirs of P. P. Pashkov" under the supervision of its co-owner Nikolai Pavlovich Pashkov.

Current Condition
During the 1990s the building was used as an unofficial disco until it suffered a fire.

On 18 March 2008, the Property Fund held tenders for the sale of rights to conclude lease agreements for the pavilion building, which was to be named "Tsarskoye Selo Station" (Pushkin, Academic Ave, 35b, lit. A). The auction winner was OOO Sansara, which concluded the contract for a period of 49 years. The possible use of the building was as a shopping mall or restaurant.

In 2010 on the 300th anniversary of Tsarskoe Selo, it was planned to restore the pavilion. But this did not happen.

The pavilion is currently almost in ruins. The sharp-pointed roof of the entrance door of honor has collapsed and been replaced with plastic coated roofing sheet. The stone carvings on the facade have survived, as well as the murals of the vaults of the front porch and some interiors have also survived. Bullet holes and shrapnel holes from the Second World War are visible on the rear / north façade where the platforms used to be. The platforms and platform canopy no longer exist.

Models

A company called Umnaya Bumaga, OOO/ "Clever Paper" produced a 1:150 card/paper model of the station building.

Gallery

See also
Tsarskoye Selo
Pushkin, Saint Petersburg
 Tsarskoye Selo Railway
 The Museum of the Moscow Railway
 Moscow Rizhskaya railway station
History of rail transport in Russia
Russian Railway Museum, in St.Petersburg
Martial Chamber

External links
The Tsar's Private Railway Station

References

Tsarskoselsky Uyezd
Palaces in Saint Petersburg
Railway stations in Saint Petersburg
Royal residences in Russia
Railway stations in the Russian Empire opened in 1895
Railway stations in the Russian Empire opened in 1912
Russian Revival architecture
Tsarskoye Selo
Cultural heritage monuments of federal significance in Saint Petersburg